St. Herman's Blue Hole National Park is a national park located just off the Hummingbird Highway in Cayo District of Belize, near Belmopan, the capital city.  It is over 500 acres (2 km²) in area, and contains two cave systems (St. Hermans and Crystal), various natural trails, and the cool jungle pool from which the park gets its name.  The park is managed by the Belize Audubon Society.

This inland "blue hole" is not to be confused with the offshore Great Blue Hole, also in Belize.

History
The Government of Belize acquired the land for the park in the 1960s and '70s. It was officially declared a national park on November 23, 1986. The park was originally named Blue Hole National Park, but its name was changed in 2005 in order to avoid confusion with Blue Hole National Monument.

Flora and fauna
The park has over 200 species of birds, including unusual tropical species such as the slaty antwren, piratic flycatcher and  red-legged honeycreeper.  Species considered local specialties are tody motmot and northern nightingale-wren.

The ocelot, jaguarundi, and jaguar have all been recorded in Blue Hole National Park.

See also
Cenote

References

External links 
Belize
Central America

Cayo District
National parks of Belize